Iruña is a district located in the Alto Paraná Department of Paraguay. Previously it was part of the district of Ñacunday, and it was created as a district in 1993. The commercial activity of the area is agriculture.

References 

Districts of Alto Paraná Department